Euryxanthops cepros is a species of crab found in the Indian Ocean around Christmas Island.

References

Xanthoidea
Crustaceans described in 1997